The 11th Cortes Generales comprised both the lower (Congress) and upper (Senate) houses of the legislature of Spain following the 2015 general election on 20 December 2015. They first convened on 13 January 2016, and were dissolved on 3 May 2016.

The 2015 election saw 52 constituencies return 350 MPs for Congress and 208 for Senate. The People's Party (PP), led by Mariano Rajoy, remained the largest party. However, with 123 seats, it lost its overall majority and had its worst election performance since 1989. The Spanish Socialist Workers' Party (PSOE) secured 90 seats, the lowest in the party's history, but managed to retain its place as the main opposition force. Newcomer parties Podemos and Citizens (C's) saw strong gains, becoming the third and fourth political forces in the country with 69 and 40 seats, respectively.

Congress of Deputies

Composition

List of members

Senate

Composition

References

External links
www.congreso.es

Members of the Cortes Generales